Lloyd B. Omdahl (born January 5, 1931) was the 34th Lieutenant Governor of North Dakota, taking office after Ruth Meiers died in 1987. Governor George A. Sinner was re-elected with Omdahl on the Democratic-NPL ticket in 1988. He was the last Democrat to hold that role to date.

Previously, Omdahl was a professor of political science at the University of North Dakota and was the Democratic nominee for North Dakota's at-large congressional district in 1976. He won the Democratic primary with 46,382 votes (86.43%), defeating Torfin Teigen, who took 7,281 votes (13.57%). In the general election, he lost to incumbent Republican Congressman Mark Andrews by 181,018 votes (62.45%) to 104,263 votes (35.97%). Russell Kleppe of the American Party took 4,600 votes (1.59%).

References

External links
Lloyd Omdahl: A Historian's Perspective

Lieutenant Governors of North Dakota
North Dakota Democrats
University of North Dakota faculty
1931 births
Living people
20th-century American politicians